Valérie Allain (born 3 April 1966) is a French actress.

She portrayed "Mireille" in the 1987 instructional television series French in Action, which acquired a cult following largely because of the appeal of the romantic comedic theme of its fifty-two episodes of full-immersion French language lessons. She has two children: a boy, born in 1990, Pablo and a girl, born in 2003, Juliette.

Professional career
 Allain was featured (but did not pose) in the November 1988 edition of Playboy in "Stars of the Cinema in 1988."

Filmography

Cinema
 (1984) – Sylvie
 (1984) – Stéphanie
Le véto (1985)
Club de rencontres (1986)
Armide, a short film in the anthology Aria (1987)
Les nouveaux tricheurs (1987)
Alouette, je te plumerai (1987)
Un parfum d'odyssée (1988)
La chambre d'ami (1988)
L'Avaro (1990)
Princesse Alexandra (1991)
La plage (1991)
De justesse (1992)
TOB (tête d'oeuf bouilli) (1994)
Le moine (1997)
Présomption d'innocence (1997)
L'inconnue de la nationale (1998)
Amorce (2000)

Television
Le chevalier de Pardaillan (1985)
French in Action (1987)
Un château au soleil (1988) (miniseries)
Duo (1990)
Un comédien dans un jeu de quilles (1990) (miniseries)
Un mort très convenable (1992) (miniseries)
Morasseix!!! (1993)
Une femme sur mesure (1997)
Cassidi et Cassidi: Le démon de midi (1997)

References

External links
Valérie Allain at :fr:Les Frigos

Valérie Allain Filmography - actricesdefrance.org
Fan Site for French in Action
Yahoo Fan Group (age restricted)
Valérie Allain and French in Action (comments section contains origins of Yale reunion with Charles Mayer) (fancyrobot.com archived by archive.org)

1966 births
Living people
French film actresses
20th-century French actresses
People from Saint-Raphaël, Var